Major General Frank Keith Simmons,  (21 February 1888 – 22 September 1952) was a senior British Army officer during the Second World War. He was commander of the Singapore Fortress when it fell to the invading Imperial Japanese Army in February 1942. He spent the remainder of the war as a prisoner of the Japanese.

Military service
Born on 21 February 1888, Simmons was educated at Cranbrook School, Kent, and was, in 1907, commissioned as a second lieutenant into the Highland Light Infantry. He served in the First World War, on the Western Front, where he awarded the Military Cross and made a Member of the Royal Victorian Order in November 1915.

Remaining in the army during the interwar period, Simmons married in 1922 and attended from 1922 to 1923 the Staff College, Camberley. Among his fellow students there included several future general officers, notably Thomas Hutton, Charles Fullbrook-Leggatt, John Evetts, Gerald Smallwood and Robert Money. After graduation from Camberley, he served as a staff officer at the War Office from 1924 to 1927. Divorcing his wife in 1926, he remarried the following year and transferred to the Queen's Own Cameron Highlanders.

Simmons then served as a Military Attache to Spain from 1928 until 1931, whereupon he then commanded the 2nd Battalion, Cameron Highlanders, from 1932 to 1936. He then commanded the Southern Brigade in British mandated Palestine, as a lieutenant colonel, accompanied by his wife, and was Chief Staff Officer to British Forces in Palestine and Transjordan, from 1937 until 1939, during the Arab revolt in Palestine.

He was the commanding officer of British forces in Shanghai in 1939 and 1940 and later the commander of British defences at the Singapore Fortress in 1941.} On 1 January 1941, he was appointed Commander of the Order of the British Empire.

An ardent supporter of the concept that defence construction was detrimental to troop morale, Simmons was eventually placed in command of a committee to ascertain the readiness of Singapore's defences as the Japanese invasion became apparent. He was appointed to "develop" the defence plan by Lieutenant General Arthur Percival. As the situation worsened for the Allies, Simmons was one of a few commanders privy to Percival's last-ditch defence plans and his "no surrender" policy of 11 February 1942.

During the final days of the battle, Simmons was transferred and ordered to command the British forces in the 'Southern Area' of the battlefield, when the decision to surrender became apparent he joined fellow commanders in voicing the opinion that continued resistance was ill-advised. Simmons spent the next three years as a prisoner of war in Japan, prior to his release in 1945 and retirement from the army in 1946.

References

Bibliography

External links
Generals of World War II

1888 births
1952 deaths
British Army generals of World War II
British Army personnel of World War I
British military personnel of the 1936–1939 Arab revolt in Palestine
British World War II prisoners of war
Commanders of the Order of the British Empire
Graduates of the Staff College, Camberley
Highland Light Infantry officers
Members of the Royal Victorian Order
Military history of Singapore during World War II
People educated at Cranbrook School, Kent
People from British Singapore
Queen's Own Cameron Highlanders officers
Recipients of the Military Cross
World War II prisoners of war held by Japan
British Army major generals
British military attachés